Amanda Ryan (born 10 October 1971) is an English actress who trained at London's Royal Academy of Dramatic Art. She is best known for her role on Channel 4's popular comedy drama Shameless as Sgt. Carrie Rogers and her appearance in the music video for "Walk Away" by Funeral for a Friend.

Career
Ryan's most internationally recognised role was when she played Lettice Howard, the fictional lover of the Duke of Norfolk in the Academy Award winning 1998 film Elizabeth starring Cate Blanchett.

The previous year Ryan played Joanna in the 1997 film Metroland, based on the 1980 novel of the same name by Julian Barnes. She starred in the Inspector Morse episode "The Daughters of Cain" as Kay Brooks. She has appeared in productions such as the BBC2 series Attachments, the film Britannic and the television adaptations of The Forsyte Saga and as Agnes Wickfield in the 1999 BBC adaptation of the Charles Dickens novel David Copperfield and, more recently, as Verity Wright in EastEnders.

Ryan's stage career includes credits in British productions of Patrick Marber's Closer, Simon Gray's Otherwise Engaged, Chekhov's The Wood Demon and in 2008 the part of Cathy in an adaptation of Wuthering Heights by April De Angelis.

Filmography

References

External links
 

1971 births
Living people
Actresses from London
Alumni of RADA
English television actresses
English film actresses
English stage actresses